A campus university is a British term for a university situated on one site, with student accommodation, teaching and research facilities, and leisure activities all together. It is derived from the Latin term campus, meaning "a flat expanse of land, plain, field".

The founding of these new institutions initiated a wave of far reaching expansion in higher education within the UK and helped open access to Higher Education to students who found access to the more traditional universities difficult or closed. The traditional universities tended to attract students from the exclusive private education sector in the UK and from privileged backgrounds whereas campus universities attracted students from all classes, backgrounds and schools (especially the state funded grammar and then later comprehensive schools).

These institutions also promoted "new" courses of study and so helped initiate not just a great expansion in numbers of students but also in the range of subjects studied.

As such, many students in the campus universities, particularly in the post-war period of 1950 to 1970, were the first member of their family ever to go to university, and were studying new and "exciting" topics, which lent a radical edge to the experience of higher education.

Campus universities are contrasted to collegiate universities, based on a number of colleges (such as the universities of Oxford, Durham, London or Cambridge) or a university consisting of a number of sites, or even individual buildings, spread throughout a town (such as the University of Edinburgh or the University of Sheffield). Confusingly, multi-site universities often call each separate site "a campus" and many original campus universities now have expanded to more than one site (or campus), for example the University of Nottingham.

The classic campus university is often found on the edge of a city. Examples include:
Aston University in Birmingham is a classic campus university, but located in the city centre of the city.
University of Bath which is just outside the city of Bath
University of Birmingham which is located in Edgbaston, 3 miles south-west of Birmingham
Brunel University London which is in Uxbridge, on the edge of West London
University of East Anglia which is 3 miles from the city of Norwich
University of Essex near Colchester
University of Exeter which has four campuses located in Devon and Cornwall
Keele University near Newcastle-under-Lyme
University of Kent which is just on the edge of the city of Canterbury
Lancaster University near the city of Lancaster
University of Nottingham which is located on the outer-suburbs of Nottingham
University of Reading which has three campuses around Reading
Robert Gordon University on the outskirts of Aberdeen
University of Roehampton which is located in south-west London
Queen Mary University of London which is located in Mile End, London
Royal Holloway, University of London on the outskirts of London
University of Stirling on the outskirts of Stirling
University of Sussex which is 4 miles from the city of Brighton
Swansea University which has two campuses, both 2 to 3 miles from Swansea
University of Warwick near Coventry
University of York on the outskirts of York

See also
 Robbins Report
 British universities
 Post-1992 universities
 Russell Group
 1994 Group

References

Higher education in the United Kingdom
Types of university or college